A ganacakra (  "gathering circle") is  also known as tsok, ganapuja, cakrapuja or ganacakrapuja. It is a generic term for various tantric assemblies or feasts, in which practitioners meet to chant mantra, enact mudra, make votive offerings and practice various tantric rituals  as part of a sādhanā, or spiritual practice.  The ganachakra often comprises a sacramental meal and festivities such as dancing, spirit possession, and trance; the feast generally consisting of materials that were considered forbidden or taboo in medieval India like meat, fish, and wine. As a tantric practice, forms of gaṇacakra are practiced today in Hinduism, Bön and Vajrayāna Buddhism.

Professor Miranda Shaw summarises the experience of a gaṇacakra:

Samuel holds that:

Origins
John Woodroffe (writing as Arthur Avalon, 1918) affirms that the panchamrita of Tantra, Hindu and Buddhist traditions are directly related to the Mahābhūta or Five Elements and that the panchamakara is actually a vulgar term for the pañcatattva:

Sacred space
The ganachakra, or 'tantric feast', can be seen as a mandala of sacred space. Pettit  emphasises the importance of the gathered "group" (gana) or sangha to Vajrayana sādhanā and the creation of sacred space such as the ganachakra:

Pettit links the importance of the group or gana to the manifestation of the ganachakra and the sacred space or the mandala (in this sense cognate with chakra) with the liturgical tools of mantra, visualisation and sacred architecture:

Pettit states that sacred space is created spontaneously wherever the Three Jewels (cognate with the gankyil) is manifest and that this sacred architecture or mandala is not dependent upon the built environment of monolithic cultures:

In Hindu tantra

In Hindu tantra, a ganachakra typically consists of five elements known as panchamakara or the "five Ms": madya (wine), mamsa (meat), matsya (fish), mudra (rice or grain), and maithuna (sex).

In Buddhist tantra

Connection with the Mahasiddhas
Samuel defines the ganachakra succinctly:

Vajranatha associates the ganachakra with the higher tantras, the anuttarayogatantra, and associates a non-monastic origin and tributary of this rite to the Mahasiddha tradition which has roots in a complex and coterie of esoteric traditions of numerous siddha and sadhu Buddhist, Hindu and non-sectarian practices and views:

In Tibetan Buddhism

In Tibetan Buddhism, it is traditional to offer a tsok (Tib. for ganachakra) to Padmasambhava or other deities, usually gurus, on the tenth lunar day, and to a form of dakini such as Yeshe Tsogyal, Mandarava or Vajrayogini on the twenty-fifth lunar day. Generally, participants are required by their samaya (bond or vow) to partake of meat and alcohol, and the rite tends to have elements symbolic of coitus.  Traditions of the Ganachakra liturgy and rite extends remains of food and other compassionate offerings to alleviate the insatiable hunger of the hungry ghosts, genius loci and other entities.

David Snellgrove (1987) holds that there is a tendency oft-promoted by Tibetan lamas who disseminate teachings in the Western world, to treat references to sexual union and to sadhana that engages with the "five impure substances" (usually referred to as the "five nectars") as symbolic. In the twilight language of correspondences and substitutions there is no inconsistency. Although, when modern tantric apologists and scholars employ the term "symbolic" as though no external practices were engaged in literally, they mislead and perpetuate an untruth. 

In the Tibetan Buddhist practice of Chöd, a variation of the gaṇacakra has the practitioner visualizing offering their own body as a feast for all beings who are all invited to the feast.

See also
Proto-Indo-Iranian religion
Sukuh
Vaishnava-Sahajiya

References

Bibliography

 
 
 
 
 
 
 
 
 

Tantric practices
Vajrayana